Corbo is a surname. In Italian language it is derived from the nickname corbo, rook, raven a central southern variant of corvo  Notable people with the surname include:

Gabriele Corbo (born 2000), Italian footballer
Mateo Corbo (born 1976), Uruguayan footballer 
Mélissa Corbo (born 1990), Canadian skier
Romeo Corbo (born 1952), Uruguayan footballer
Walter Corbo (born 1949), Uruguayan footballer

See also

References